Barangay Northbay Boulevard South 2  is one of the eighteen barangays of the City of Navotas . it will be led by an elected Chairman in October 2013.  It is divided on Northbay Boulevard South 1, Northbay Boulevard South 2 . Northbay Boulevard South 3 on 2013.

Barangays of Metro Manila
Navotas